FACA may refer to:

 Federación Anarco-Comunista de Argentina, a platformist anarchist political organisation in Argentina
 Federal Advisory Committee Act, a United States statute
 Federation of Anglican Churches in the Americas
 Military of the Central African Republic, les Forces armées centrafricaines
 Fiji Cycling Association
 Facatativa, Colombia. A city and municipality in the Cundinamarca Department in Colombia, South America